Ongael Island is an island in Koror State, Palau. It is the location of the famous Ongael Lake.

References

External links 
Wondermondo: Uet era Ongael - marine lake of jellyfish

Uninhabited islands of Palau
Koror